China Power may stand for the following companies:

China Power Investment Corporation, a state-owned power generation enterprise in China, absorbed into the State Power Investment Corporation
China Power International Holding Limited, a subsidiary of CPIC and also a predecessor of CPIC founded in 1994
China Power International Development, a listed subsidiary of State Power Investment Corporation

See also
 CLP Group, a Hong Kong-based power generation company with former name China Light and Power